Sogeram River is a river in Madang Province, Papua New Guinea.

The Sogeram River languages are spoken in the Sogeram River watershed.

See also
Sogeram River languages

References

Rivers of Papua New Guinea